Melanella antarctica is a species of sea snail, a marine gastropod mollusk in the family Eulimidae. The species is one of many species known to exist within the genus, Melanella. As the biological classification states, this species is notable for being mainly distributed in southern waters, these would include the Amundsen Sea, Bellingshausen Sea, Weddell Sea and the Ross Sea respectively.

Description 
The maximum recorded shell length is 4 mm.

Habitat 
Minimum recorded depth is 102 m. Maximum recorded depth is 489 m.

References

External links

antarctica
Gastropods described in 1908